Hemchandracharya North Gujarat University (HNGU) is a public university in Patan, Gujarat, India. The geographical jurisdiction of the North Gujarat University encompasses four districts: Aravalli_district, Banaskantha, Mehsana, Patan and Sabarkantha. It is NAAC 'A' accredited state university with a CGPA of 3.02.

History
North Gujarat University was established by Ordinance No. 5 of 1986 dated 17 May 1986 which was later passed as the North Gujarat University Act No. 22 of 1986 on 11 September 1986 by Gujarat Legislative Assembly.

Location and campus growth
This university was carved out of Gujarat University. On bifurcation, the North Gujarat University inherited no physical assets from its parent university.

Patan, a historical town in northern part of Gujarat, was officially designated as the headquarters of the university. The town happens to have composite campus of four affiliated colleges. The managing council of the colleges was kind enough to let the infant university rent its two hostel buildings to accommodate its offices. Thus the university began to operate and serve 41 colleges scattered over the three districts of Banaskantha, Mehsana and Sabarkantha.

With the two hostel buildings, the university rented Gandhi Memorial Hall to house its library. The aim was to start building a nucleus library for the future post-graduate departments.

This entailed considerable delay owing to litigation in the State High Court and then in the Supreme Court.

Following the Supreme Court judgment, acquisition of the land has been possible. As a result, over the years the university has been able to get land as follows: 
 Government land  
 Land acquired from farmers .

In addition to this, the university has received a property worth Rs.10 lakhs donated by the Gramodhyog Mandal, Patan. The university employment bureau is housed in that building. Proposals to the state government for further assistance in materializing plans for more constructions, in phased manner, are under active consideration.

Vice-Chancellor

       Shri K.P. Yajnik	Dt. 01-08-1986 to 31-07-1992
	Dr. D.A. Ghanchi	Dt. 01-08-1992 to 05-04-1994 (Acting)
	Prin. C.D. Trivedi	Dt. 06-04-1994 to 30-04-1994 (Acting)
	Prof. N.R. Dave	        Dt. 30-04-1994 to 30-04-2000
	Dr. B.S. Jani	        Dt. 01-05-2000 to 30-04-2003
	Dr. M.M. Patel          Dt. 01-05-2003 to 27-01-2005 (Acting)
	Dr. M.M. Patel	        Dt. 28-01-2005 to 10-07-2006	
	Dr. B.A. Prajapati	Dt. 10-07-2006 to 26-07-2007 (Acting)
	Dr. K.K. Shah	        Dt. 26-07-2007 to 26-07-2010
	Dr. J. H. Pancholi	Dt. 27-07-2010 to 15-09-2010 (Acting)
	Dr. H.V. Rao	        Dt. 16-09-2010 to 15-09-2013
	Dr. R. L. Godara	Dt. 16-09-2013 to 16-09-2016
	Dr. D.H. Devada	        Dt. 16-09-2016 to 20-12-2016 (Acting)
	Prof. B. A. Prajapati	Dt. 20-12-2016 to 06-03-2019
       Dr. Anil J. Nayak       Dt. 07-03-2019 to 07-01-2020(Acting)
       Prof. (Dr.) Jabali J. Vora   Dt. 08-01-2020 to

Departments and centres

Departments
 Department of Chemistry
 Department of Life sciences
 Department of Mathematics
 Department of Computer science
 Department of Commerce & Management
 Department of English
 Department of Sanskrit
 Department of Education
 Department of Physics
 Department of Library & Information Science
 Department of Social Work 
 Department of Journalism
 Department of Hospital management
Department of law

Centres
 Centre for Indian Diaspora
 Centre for Cede
 Computer Centre
 Study Centre for BAOU

References

External links
 
 Website of Hemchandracharya North Gujarat University Doctoral Programme
 

Universities in Gujarat
Patan district
1986 establishments in Gujarat
Educational institutions established in 1986